Mayo is a municipality in the Papineau Regional County Municipality of western Quebec, located northeast of the city of Gatineau (Buckingham sector). Mayo is south of the hamlet of Mulgrave-et-Derry.

History
The area which would become the municipality of Mayo in 1864, just north of the township of Lochaber, began to be settled in the nineteenth century mainly by Irish and German immigrants as well as French Canadians.  The Irish settlers arrived in Mayo between 1820-1830, pre-famine immigrants.  They would have arrived in Montreal and traveled along the Ottawa River and then along the Blanche River.  The settlers would have found great comfort in their new surroundings, the hilly terrain resembling that of Ireland, and subsequently their new home was named Mayo after County Mayo in Ireland.  The main industries which drive the economics of the municipality were, and still are, farming and forestry as well as the manufacturing of potash.

Demographics

Mother tongue:
 English as first language: 24.1%
 French as first language: 68.1%
 English and French as first language: 5%
 Other as first language: 2.1%

Our Lady of Knock Shrine
The people of Mayo had a strong connection with their Irish roots.  The parish of St. Malachy in Mayo was very important in the municipality's connection with Ireland.  In County Mayo, Ireland there is a town called Knock where, in 1879, there were reports of an apparition of the Virgin Mary, St. Joseph and St. John.  The story of this miracle was brought to Canada as early as 1882, and in 1949 the then pastor of St. Malachy, Father Braceland, was inspired to construct a replica of the Our Lady of Knock Shrine in Mayo.

La Blanche Forest
The La Blanche forest, located on the eastern shores of La Blanche Lake in Mayo and Mulgrave-et-Derry, contains rare old-growth forest and many endangered plant species such as ginseng.  The forest is protected in the Forêt-la-Blanche Ecological Reserve, a  area of preservation for this forest which has been sheltered from disturbance for centuries.  The forest is also home to many species of rare birds such as the blue heron and the cerulean warbler.  The La Blanche forest was designated a permanent protected area in October 2003 giving it the legal distinction of an ecological reserve, the highest protection possible in Quebec.

References

External links

Municipalities in Quebec
Incorporated places in Outaouais